Ankenes Church is a parish church of the Church of Norway in Narvik Municipality in Nordland county, Norway.  It is located in the village of Ankenesstranda. It is the main church for the Ankenes parish which is part of the Ofoten prosti (deanery) in the Diocese of Sør-Hålogaland. The white, wooden church was built in an octagonal style in 1842 using plans drawn up by the architect Ingebrigt Julin. The church seats about 380 people.

History
The first church in Ankenes was built around 1652-1661. Around 1730, the old church was torn down and a new church was rebuilt on the same site. Then in 1842, the old church was torn down and a new building was constructed on the same site. The new church was consecrated on 26 September 1842. In 1879-1880, the church was renovated and redecorated. In 1940, during World War II, the church was damaged during the fighting. It was repaired in 1947.

Media gallery

See also
List of churches in Sør-Hålogaland
Octagonal churches in Norway

References

Narvik
Churches in Nordland
Wooden churches in Norway
Octagonal churches in Norway
19th-century Church of Norway church buildings
Churches completed in 1842
17th-century establishments in Norway